The Battle of Burnt Corn, also known as the Battle of Burnt Corn Creek, was an encounter between United States armed forces and Creek Indians that took place July 27, 1813 in present-day southern Alabama. The battle was part of the Creek War.

Background
In July 1813, Peter McQueen, a Creek Native American chief, and a large party of Red Stick warriors proceeded to Pensacola, Florida to buy munitions, with $400 and a letter from a British officer at Fort Malden. In McQueen's words, the Spanish governor gave them "a small bag of powder for each ten towns, and five bullets to each man." The governor presented this as a "friendly present, for hunting purposes".

But Samuel Moniac, a Creek warrior, testified August 2, 1813 after the events, "High Head told me that, when they went back with their supply, another body of men would go down for another supply of ammunition; and that ten men were to go out of town, and they calculated on 'five horse-loads for every town'."

Battle
United States soldiers at Fort Mims, having heard of Peter McQueen's mission, sent  a quickly organized force, led by Colonel James Caller and Captain Dixon Bailey, to intercept McQueen's party. This force was joined by volunteers from Fort Glass under the command of Samuel Dale. The Americans ambushed the Red Sticks as they bedded down on the evening of July 27, 1813, on the banks of Burnt Corn Creek, in present-day southern Alabama (in what is now northern Escambia County, Alabama). It would become known as "The Battle of Burnt Corn" or the "Battle of Burnt Corn Creek," and would be seen as a part of the broader Creek War.

The Americans scattered the Red Sticks, who fled to the nearby swamps. Flush with victory, the Americans began looting the Red Sticks' pack-horses. From the swamp, the Creeks noticed that the Americans had dropped their guard. The Creek re-grouped and launched a surprise attack of their own, which scattered the Americans.

Gallery

References

External links
A map of Creek War Battle Sites from the PCL Map Collection at the University of Texas at Austin.
Account of the Battle of Burnt Corn
The Deposition of Samuel Moniac taken in 1813.

Burnt Corn
1813 in the United States
Burnt Corn
Native American history of Alabama
July 1813 events
Burnt Corn